The 2012 Colorado International was a professional tennis tournament played on outdoor hard courts. It was the 1st edition of the tournament and was part of the 2012 ITF Women's Circuit. It took place in Denver, United States between 2 and 8 July 2012.

WTA entrants

Seeds

 Rankings are as of June 25, 2012.

Other entrants
The following players received wildcards into the singles main draw:
  Vasilisa Bardina

The following players received entry from the qualifying draw:
  Jan Abaza
  Nicole Gibbs
  Mayo Hibi
  Tori Kinard

The following players received entry by a Special Ranking:
  Zhou Yimiao

Champions

Singles

 Nicole Gibbs def.  Julie Coin, 6–2, 3–6, 6–4

Doubles

 Marie-Ève Pelletier /  Shelby Rogers def.  Lauren Embree /  Nicole Gibbs, 6–3, 3–6, [12–10]

External links
Official website
ITF website

Colorado International
Hard court tennis tournaments in the United States